George Cuculick was an American ice hockey goaltender who was an All-American for Michigan Tech.

Career
Cuculick played for his home-town junior team, the Barrie Flyers. In 1953 he helped the Flyers win the Memorial Cup along with future NHLers Don McKenney, Doug Mohns and Orval Tessier. In 1956 Cuculick was a member of the first recruiting class for John MacInnes at Michigan Tech. After a year with the freshman squad, he became a three-year starter for the Huskies and helped lead them back to the NCAA Tournament in his senior season. He was named as an All-American that season and made the inaugural All-WCHA Second Team. In the 1960 Tournament Cuculick led the Huskies past St. Lawrence with a dominant 13–3 victory. In the championship game, MTC was the equal of Denver for much of the game but the Pioneers pulled ahead late and denied Michigan Tech their first championship.

After graduating, Cuculick played briefly with the Minneapolis Millers before retiring as a player. He was inducted into the Michigan Tech Athletic Hall of Fame in 1998.

Statistics

Regular season and playoffs

Awards and honors

References

External links

1935 births
1999 deaths
Canadian ice hockey goaltenders
Ice hockey people from Simcoe County
Sportspeople from Barrie
Barrie Flyers players
Michigan Tech Huskies men's ice hockey players
Minneapolis Millers (IHL) players
AHCA Division I men's ice hockey All-Americans